Elachista ladiniella is a moth in the family Elachistidae. It was described by Friedrich Hartig in 1938. It is found in southern Austrian state of Tyrol.

References

Moths described in 1938
ladiniella
Moths of Europe